Dyan Neille Buis (born 30 November 1990 in Riversdale, Western Cape) is a South African Paralympic sprint runner and long jumper. He has mild cerebral palsy and competes in the T38 class.

In 2012, Buis was a student at Global University in Cape Town, RSA, in Religious and Theological Studies, and trained at Maties Helderberg Disabled Sports Club in Stellenbosch. He competed at the 2012 Paralympic Games, where he won a Bronze Medal in the men's long jump with a world record time for his class of 6.48 metres. He also won a Silver Medal in the Men's 100m for his class.

In 2016, at the 2016 Paralympics, Buis ran a 54.66 in the second heat to qualify third for the finals behind Dixon de Jesus Hooker Velasquez and Weiner Javier Diaz Mosquera both from Colombia. In the Finals, Buis set a new personal best of 49.46 seconds and won Gold. The second place went to China's Jianwen Hu and third to Colombia's Weiner Javier Diaz Mosquera.

References

1990 births
Living people
Paralympic athletes of South Africa
Paralympic gold medalists for South Africa
Paralympic silver medalists for South Africa
Paralympic bronze medalists for South Africa
Medalists at the 2012 Summer Paralympics
Medalists at the 2016 Summer Paralympics
Athletes (track and field) at the 2012 Summer Paralympics
Athletes (track and field) at the 2016 Summer Paralympics
Afrikaner people
World record holders in Paralympic athletics
Commonwealth Games medallists in athletics
Commonwealth Games silver medallists for South Africa
Athletes (track and field) at the 2018 Commonwealth Games
Paralympic medalists in athletics (track and field)
South African male sprinters
South African male long jumpers
20th-century South African people
21st-century South African people
Medallists at the 2018 Commonwealth Games